Danilo I (1271–72) was the fourth Archbishop of Serbs. After the death of Archbishop Sava II (s. 1263–1271) on 8 February 1271, Danilo was chosen as the next Archbishop. However, he was replaced after a year in 1272 by Joanikije I (s. 1272–1276). Archbishop Danilo II (s. 1324–1337) wrote "Archbishop Danilo succeeded on the holy seat, but due to some cause was removed". The cause of his removal is unknown, it may have been due to Danilo having been unsupportive of King Stefan Uroš I (and supportive of Stefan Dragutin); this theory is strengthened by the fact that Danilo's successor Joanikije was a fanatic supporter of Uroš I. It is unlikely that Danilo II did not know the cause of Danilo I's removal.

He wrote medieval biographies of Stefan Dragutin (before 1316), Stefan Milutin (after April 1332) and Helen of Anjou (1317 or soon after). In an effort to strengthen the rule of Stefan Milutin, Danilo highlighted that Helen (born as Roman Catholic) accustomed herself to and accepted Serbian Orthodox Church.

References

Further reading
Petković, Sreten. "Archbishop Danilo I: The donor of the frescoes in the prothesis of the Church of the Holy Apostles in Peć." Zograf 30: 81-88.

13th-century Serbian people
13th-century Eastern Orthodox bishops
Archbishops of Serbs
Eastern Orthodox Christians from Serbia
Year of birth missing
Year of death missing
People of the Kingdom of Serbia (medieval)
Medieval Serbian Orthodox clergy
Clergy removed from office